Tom Holt (21 October 1923 – 17 August 2004) was a British swimmer. He competed in the men's 400 metre freestyle at the 1948 Summer Olympics.

References

1923 births
2004 deaths
British male swimmers
Olympic swimmers of Great Britain
Swimmers at the 1948 Summer Olympics
Place of birth missing
British male freestyle swimmers